Sheriffs in New Zealand are officers of the Superior Courts and function as the executive arm of these courts. They are responsible for serving court processes like summonses and subpoenas in the same way that Bailiffs serve the court processes of the District Court of New Zealand. They play an important role in the execution of court orders of the High Court, Court of Appeal and the Supreme Court of New Zealand. Sheriffs are forbidden from acting as barristers, solicitors, or acting as agent of a law firm while employed in the role of Sheriff. 

Sheriffs in New Zealand have had various different roles and responsibilities in different eras of the country and today Sheriffs have a dramatically diminished role compared to the past.

Today 
Today the role of Sheriff and court Registrar are a dual position where the role of sheriff is automatically given to anyone who has gained the position of Registrar, as the Senior Courts Act 2016 states that each "Registrar is also a Sheriff for New Zealand". Deputy Registrars and other officials may also be appointed as Deputy Sheriffs to help and assist Sheriffs. 

Sheriffs have the powers to serve the court such as summonses, to enforce the orders of the court and the power to arrest a person in accordance with an order of the High Court. Sheriffs can ask Deputy Sheriffs, Bailiffs, any Sheriff's officers that they employ to help them in their duties, however in practice, the police often carry out the functions of sheriffs on their behalf.

The duties of Sheriffs can extend from selling properties owned by indebted people on the behalf of the High Court (like a like an apartment block) or performing constitutionally required ceremonial duties like escorting the Chief Justice when they are opening a new session of the New Zealand Parliament.

History 

At the beginning of New Zealand's colonial history, sheriffs were appointed by the governor to enforce orders of the court, starting with Sheriff James Coates, who was appointed by Governor William Hobson to be the "Sheriff of the Colony of New Zealand and its Dependencies" in July 1841. Sheriffs at this time had the responsibility of upholding capital punishments by finding a willing executioner and organising the execution event, as was first overseen by Coates in 1842. After Coates was joined by other individuals appointed as sheriff in 1842, he was alternatively referred to as the "High Sheriff" in order to show his seniority compared to the other "Sub-Sheriffs".

Further, between 1840 and 1853 they had the additional responsibility of building and running local gaols (jails) and hire gaolers (jailers) to manage the prisoners. The underfunded and overcrowded gaols were of such poor condition that responsibility for running these gaols were handed over to the recently established provincial governments in 1853. For a period of time the responsibility for funding the local sheriff's offices was also handed over to the various provincial governments throughout the country, although outlaw James McKenzie was still able escape from Lyttelton Gaol on at least two occasions due to the poor condition of the gaol in 1855.

Alexander McDonald resigned from the job of sheriff of Nelson in 1843 after only a few months after he received a letter from the Colonial Secretary reminding him that his job was to conduct the business of the courts and to not organise public meetings and engage in other endeavours that were not and the job description.

After 1853, with the signing of the New Zealand Constitution Act 1852, sheriffs also acted as the returning officers in both provincial and national elections. In July 1861, Sheriff Shafto Harrison created controversy when he was elected to the Wellington Provincial Government while also being employed as the Sheriff of Wanganui who had electoral overseeing duties.

To help with these increased duties, a number of sheriffs in 1859 were given the assistance of a deputy sheriff to help them complete matters of the sheriff's office.

In 1866 there was considerable scandal when the former sheriff of Otago, Robert Henry Forman, was arrested on board a ship leaving for Sydney shortly after he resigned and was charged with unlawfully taking money for his own use. Further scandal was created when he was granted a discharge without conviction. Further scandal came in 1872 with the appointment of William Henry Eyes as sheriff of Marlborough, who was a convicted rapist and got caught engaging in adultery not long after he became sheriff.

Lists of sheriffs

New Ulster and New Munster

Auckland

Taranaki

Hawke's Bay

Wellington

Nelson

Marlborough

Canterbury

Otago

Southland

References 

Law enforcement in New Zealand